The Other Side... Demos and Rarities is the second compilation extended play by UK-based pop act Shakespears Sister, released in May 2013 exclusively through the newly re-opened digital store on the act's official website.. The seven-track EP consists of demos, remixes, and previously never-heard unreleased songs.

Track listing

References 

2011 EPs
Shakespears Sister albums